Messapus is a genus of African corinnid sac spiders first described by Eugène Simon in 1898.

Species
 it contains seven species:
Messapus martini Simon, 1898 — Zambia, South Africa
Messapus megae Haddad & Mbo, 2015 — Zimbabwe
Messapus meridionalis Haddad & Mbo, 2015 — South Africa
Messapus natalis (Pocock, 1898) — Mozambique, South Africa
Messapus seiugatus Haddad & Mbo, 2015 — Guinea
Messapus tigris Haddad & Mbo, 2015 — Botswana, Namibia
Messapus tropicus Haddad & Mbo, 2015 — Congo

References

Araneomorphae genera
Corinnidae